Gujarat Titans is a franchise cricket team based in Ahmedabad, Gujarat, India. The Titans compete in the Indian Premier League (IPL). Founded in 2021, Gujarat Titans' home ground is Narendra Modi Stadium in Motera. The franchise is owned by CVC Capital Partners. The team is captained by Hardik Pandya and coached by Ashish Nehra. The Gujarat Titans are the current IPL champions, having won their maiden title in the 2022 season.

Franchise history 
The Governing Council of the Indian Premier League issued an invitation to tender for two new sides in August 2021. A total of 22 companies declared an interest, but with a high base price for the new teams, there were no more than six serious bidders. The Board of Control for Cricket in India allowed a consortium of three companies or individuals to bid for each franchise.

CVC Capital Partners has won the Ahmedabad franchise in the auction that was held in Dubai in October 2021.

Ahead of the IPL 2022 mega auction, the franchise drafted Hardik Pandya as their captain. The franchise also picked Shubman Gill and Rashid Khan.

The Ahmedabad franchise revealed the name of its cricket team as the Gujarat Titans on 9 February 2022.

Background 

Gujarat Titans have chosen to retain three players ahead of the 2022 mega-auction. All-rounder Hardik Pandya was drafted for ₹15 crore, bowler Rashid Khan was snapped for ₹15 crore and batsman Shubman Gill was drafted for ₹8 crore.

After drafting three players for Gujarat Titans by spending ₹38 crore, they had the remaining purse of ₹52 crore ahead of the 2022 mega auction as the franchise is allowed to have a total purse of ₹90 crore.

They had 22 open slots (for building a squad of 25 players) and seven of these could be overseas players.

Adding to this, Gujarat Titans have signed 18 more new players in the two-day IPL 2022 mega auction. New Zealand fast bowler Lockie Ferguson (base price – ₹2 crore) was their most expensive purchase, for whom they spent ₹10 crore. Hardik Pandya-led Gujarat Titans have picked up 7 players by paying ₹33.15 crore on day 1 of the IPL 2022 mega auction, including 3 overseas players.

Lockie Ferguson (₹10 crore), Rahul Tewatia (₹9 crore), Mohammad Shami (₹6.25 crore), R Sai Kishore (₹3 crore), Abhinav Manohar Sadarangani (₹2.6 crore), Jason Roy (₹2 crore) and Noor Ahmad (₹30 lakh) have been drafted on day 1 of the mega auction.

After day 1 of the auction, the team had the remaining purse of ₹18.85 crore for day 2 of the mega auction.

Team history

2022 IPL season 

Although their auction methods and their selections during their first-ever auction were considered weak, and the team was written off, the Titans surprised everyone with their performances, gaining their first win against fellow newcomers Lucknow Super Giants. That win was the first in their inaugural campaign, which saw the Titans eventually win 10 of their 14 group matches, qualifying at the top of the table with 20 points. They then won the first qualifier against Rajasthan Royals, whom they would meet again in the final after their qualifier win against Royal Challengers Bangalore. Gujarat won the final by restricting Rajasthan to 130 on a pitch on which they were asked to bowl first, and chasing down the target with 11 balls to spare, which included Shubman Gill hitting the winning six off the first ball of the 19th over. Hardik Pandya was adjudged the Man of the Match for his bowling figures of 3/17 and his 34 from 30 balls with a strike rate of 113.33. Critics have praised Pandya's captaincy, bowling, and batting, with many agreeing that he and the management used their players well and have worked as a team to win the tournament.

This win meant that Gujarat became the second team to win the IPL in their very first season, the first being their final opponents, Rajasthan Royals. Nevertheless, Gujarat became the first team in the IPL against teams who already have been playing since 2008 to win the title in their very first outing. This win is also Hardik's 5th IPL title, and first as a captain, having won all previous four with the Mumbai Indians.

Team identity

Team anthem
The team anthem used to be 'Aava De'. In the first IPL season, the song was sung by Aditya Gadhvi.

Home ground 
The team's home ground is the Narendra Modi Stadium, which is situated in Ahmedabad, Gujarat.

Kit manufacturers and sponsors

Seasons

Current squad
 Players with international caps are listed in bold.

Administration and support staff

References

External links 
Official website

Indian Premier League teams
Cricket in Ahmedabad
Sports clubs in India
Sport in Ahmedabad
Sports clubs established in 2022
2022 establishments in India
 
Cricket clubs established in 2022